The 1908 Sewanee Tigers football team represented the Sewanee Tigers of Sewanee: The University of the South during the 1908 Southern Intercollegiate Athletic Association football season. Sewanee fought rival Vanderbilt to a scoreless tie.

Schedule

References

Sewanee
Sewanee Tigers football seasons
Sewanee Tigers football